Bob Dotter (October 28, 1938September 1, 2003) was a three-time Automobile Racing Club of America Super Car Champion driver. Winning the title in 1980, 1983 and 1984. He was born in South Carolina but moved to Chicago, Illinois when he was young. He lost his left arm in an industrial accident in the early 60s. He drove and built his own race cars despite his loss. Bob is the father of NASCAR driver-turned-SS-Green Light Racing team owner Bobby Dotter and competed in three Busch Series events in his own right, finishing a career-best 17th at O'Reilly Raceway Park in 1983.

Dotter died in 2003 from lung cancer.

Motorsports career results

NASCAR
(key) (Bold – Pole position awarded by qualifying time. Italics – Pole position earned by points standings or practice time. * – Most laps led.)

Busch Series

References

External links
 

1938 births
2003 deaths
Racing drivers from South Carolina
NASCAR drivers
ARCA Menards Series drivers
Deaths from lung cancer
Racing drivers from Chicago